The Japanese chisel or  is made on similar principles to the Japanese plane. There is a hard blade, called hagane attached to a softer piece of metal called the jigane.

Types

 The  is the most usual type of Japanese chisel. The name literally means rabbeting chisel.
 The  has beveled edges for making dovetail joints.

Preparation

A Japanese chisel usually requires some set-up, called . The metal ring attached to the handle must be removed, the wood and ring filed to match, the ring replaced on the chisel and then the wood beaten down around the ring so that the mallet strikes the wood. The function of the metal ring is to prevent the wooden handle from splitting.

Sharpening

Japanese carpenters use waterstones for sharpening.

See also

Japanese carpentry

Handles
The handles are often made of Red or White Oak .

Woodworking chisels
Chisel

pam:Patperant=fly